Thomas Mormann (born 1951) is Professor of Philosophy at the University of the Basque Country in Donostia-San Sebastian, Spain.  He obtained his PhD in Mathematics from the University of Dortmund (1978).  He obtained his Habilitation from the University of Munich.  He works in the philosophy of science, formal ontology, structuralism, Carnap studies, and neo-Kantianism.

Selected publications
 
 Mormann, T. Continuous lattices and Whiteheadian theory of space. The Second German-Polish Workshop on Logic & Logical Philosophy (Żagań, 1998). Logic and Log. Philos. No. 6 (1998), 35–54.
 W. Diederich, A. Ibarra, T. Mormann. Bibliography of structuralism. Erkenntnis, 1989, Springer.
 T. Mormann. Rudolf Carnap. München, Beck, 2000.
 T. Mormann. Ist der Begriff der Repräsentation obsolete? Zeitschrift für philosophische Forschung, 1997. 
 J. Echeverría, A. Ibarra, T. Mormann. The Space of Mathematics: Philosophical, Epistemological and Historical Explorations. 1992.

External links
 https://facultyofphilosophyande.academia.edu/ThomasMormann

21st-century Spanish philosophers
Ontologists
Philosophers of science
Academic staff of the University of the Basque Country
1951 births
Living people